William "Bill" Yeager  (born June 16, 1940, San Francisco) is an American engineer. He is best known for being the inventor of a packet-switched, "Ships in the Night," multiple-protocol router in 1981, during his 20-year tenure at Stanford's Knowledge Systems Laboratory as well as the Stanford University Computer Science department.
The code routed Parc Universal Packet (PUP), XNS, IP and CHAOSNet. The router used Bill's Network Operating System (NOS). The NOS also supported the EtherTIPS that were used throughout the Stanford LAN for terminal access to both the LAN and the Internet. This code was licensed by Cisco Systems in 1987 and comprised the core of the first Cisco IOS. This provided the groundwork for a new, global communications approach.

He is also known for his role in the creation of the IMAP mail protocol. In 1984 he conceived of a client/server protocol, designed its functionality, applied for and received the grant money for its implementation. In 1985 Mark Crispin was hired to work with Bill on what became the IMAP protocol. Along with Mark, who implemented the protocols details and wrote the first client, MMD, Bill wrote the first Unix IMAP server. Bill later implemented MacMM which was the first MacIntosh IMAP client. Frank Gilmurray assisted with the initial part of this implementation.

At Stanford in 1979 Bill wrote the ttyftp serial line file transfer program, which was developed into the MacIntosh version of the Kermit protocol at Columbia University. He was initially hired in August 1975 as a member of Dr. Elliott Levanthal's Instrumentation Research Laboratory. Here, Bill was responsible for a small computer laboratory for biomedical applications of mass spectrometry. This laboratory in conjunction with several chemists, and the Department of inherited rare diseases in the medical school made significant inroads in identifying inherited rare diseases from the gas chromatograph, mass spectrometer data generated from blood and urine samples of sick children. His significant accomplishment was to complete a prototype program initiated by Dr. R. Geoff Dromey  called CLEANUP. This program "extracted representative spectra from GC/MS data," and was later used by the EPA to detect water pollutants.

From 1970 to 1975 he worked at NASA Ames Research Center where he wrote, as a part of the Pioneer 10/11 mission control operating system, both the telemetry monitoring and real time display of the images of Jupiter.  After his stint at Stanford he worked for 10 years at Sun Microsystems.

At Sun as the CTO of Project JXTA he filed 40 US Patents, and along with Rita Yu Chen, designed and implemented the JXTA security solutions. In 2002 he along with Jeff Altman, then a contributor to the JXTA Open Source community, initiated the effort to establish the Internet Research Task Force (IRTF) Peer-to-Peer working group. The working group was created in 2003. Bill was the working group chair until 2005.

As Chief Scientist at Peerouette, Inc., he filed 2 US and 2 European Union Patents. He has so far been granted 20 US Patents 4 of which are on the SIMS High Performance Email Servers which he invented and with a small team of engineers implemented, and 16 on P2P and distributed computing. In the Summer of 1999 under the guidance of Greg Papadopoulos, Sun's CTO, and reporting directly to Carl Cargill, Sun's director of corporate standards, led Sun's WAP Forum team with the major objective, "...  to work with the WAP Forum on the convergence of the WAP protocol suite with IETF, W3C and Java standards."

During this same period of time he invented the iPlanet Wireless Services. The latter was a Java proxy between IMAP Mail servers and either WAP Servers, or Web Browers. It proxied the following markup languages:  The Handheld Device Markup Language, HDML, the Wireless Markup Language, WML, as well as HTML. This was a one person project supported by SFR/Cegetel in France. The primary goal was to enable email service to WAP phones.

He received his bachelor's degree in mathematics from the University of California, Berkeley in 1964; his master's degree in mathematics from San Jose State University in San Jose, California, in 1966; and completed his doctoral course work at the University of Washington in Seattle, Washington in 1970. Then decided to abandon mathematics for a career in software engineering and research to the skepticism of his thesis advisor because Bill thought the future was in computing.

Patents 
Personal Server and network - Patent Application for Peerouette P2P Technology
Global community naming authority - Patent Application for Peerouette P2P Technology
[US Patent 6,167,402 - High Performance Message Store]
[US Patent 6,735,770 - Method and apparatus for high performance access to data in a message store]
[US Patent 6,418,542 - Critical signal thread]
[US Patent 6,457,064 - Method and apparatus for detecting input directed to a thread in a multi-threaded process]
[US Patent 7,065,579 - System using peer discovery and peer membership protocols for accessing peer-to-peer platform resources on a network]
[US Patent 7,127,613 - Secured peer-to-peer network data exchange]
[US Patent 7,136,927 - Peer-to-peer resource resolution]
[US Patent 7,167,920 - Peer-to-peer communication pipes]
[US Patent 7,213,047 - Peer trust evaluation using mobile agents in peer-to-peer networks]
[US Patent 7,203,753 - Propagating and updating trust relationships in distributed peer-to-peer networks]
[US Patent 7,222,187 - Distributed trust mechanism for decentralized networks]
[US Patent 7,254,608 - Managing Distribution of Content Using Mobile Agents in Peer-to-Peer Networks]
[US Patent 7,275,102 - Trust Mechanisms for a Peer-to-Peer Network Computing Platform]
[US Patent 7,290,280 - Method and apparatus to facilitate virtual transport layer security on a virtual network]
[US Patent 7,308,496 - Representing Trust in Distributed Peer-to-Peer Networks]
[US Patent 7,340,500 - Providing peer groups in a peer-to-peer environment]
[US Patent 8,108,455 - Mobile Agents in Peer-to-Peer networks]
[US Patent 8,160,077 - Peer-to-Peer communication pipes]
[US Patent 8,176,189 - Peer-to-Peer network computing platform]
[US Patent 8,359,397 - Reliable peer-to-peer connections]

References

External links
Sun Microsystems biography
Valley of the Nerds: Who Really Invented the Multiprotocol Router, and Why Should We Care?
"A start-up's true tale", Mercury News, 2001-01-12
Interview at Networkworld.com

1940 births
Living people
21st-century American engineers
American inventors
Sun Microsystems people
UC Berkeley College of Letters and Science alumni
San Jose State University alumni
University of Washington alumni
Stanford University faculty